Uczta is the third studio album by Polish singer Sanah. It was released by Magic Records and Universal Music Polska on 15 April 2022.

Uczta is a combination of indie pop. The album was produced by Paweł Odoszewski, Dominic Buczkowski-Wojtaszek, Patryk Kumór, Jakub Dąbrowski, Marek Dziedzic, Arkadiusz Kopera and Jakub Galiński.

It peaked at number one on the Polish albums chart and has been certified diamond by the Polish Society of the Phonographic Industry (ZPAV) on 7 December 2022.

Track listing

Charts

Weekly charts

Year-end charts

Certifications

Release history

See also
 List of number-one albums of 2022 (Poland)

References

2022 albums
Polish-language albums
Sanah (singer) albums
Magic Records albums
Universal Music Group albums